Trygve Moe may refer to:

 Trygve Moe (politician) (1920–1998), Norwegian politician for the Liberal Party and the Liberal People's Party
 Trygve Moe (journalist) (born 1927), Norwegian journalist

See also
 Moe (surname)